The 1938 German Ice Hockey Championship was the 22nd season of the German Ice Hockey Championship, the national championship of Germany. Eight teams participated in the championship, and SC Riessersee won the title.

First round

Group A

Group B

Final round

2nd place game

References

External links
German ice hockey standings 1933-1945

Ger
German Ice Hockey Championship seasons
Champ